Joseph Henry Charles Ing (16 October 1890 – 1977) was an English professional footballer who played in the Football League for Clapton Orient as a right half.

Personal life 
Ing served in the Royal Navy during the First World War.

Career statistics

References

English footballers
English Football League players
Leyton Orient F.C. players
Association football wing halves
1890 births
1977 deaths
Royal Navy personnel of World War I
People from Walthamstow
Ebbsfleet United F.C. players
Swindon Town F.C. players